SS Ajax was a Norwegian cargo ship that was destroyed with explosive charges by  in the English Channel 30 nautical miles (56 km) north of Ouessant, Finistère, France, while she was travelling from Rufisque, Senegal to Liverpool,  United Kingdom.

Construction 
Ajax was constructed in 1904 with yard no. 50 at the Framnæs Mekaniske Værksted - FMV - (Framnæs) A/S shipyard in Sandefjord, Norway. She was completed in August 1904 under the name Spir but was renamed Bøilefos in 1912 and Ajax in 1915.

She had a triple expansion steam engine driving a single screw propeller. The engine was rated at 128 nhp.

Sinking 
On 22 February 1917, Ajax was on a voyage from Rufisque, Senegal to Liverpool, United Kingdom. The ship sank with no loss of life. At the time of her sinking Ajax was carrying a cargo of groundnuts.

References

1904 ships
Ships built in Sandefjord
Steamships of Norway
World War I merchant ships of Norway
Maritime incidents in 1917
Ships sunk by German submarines in World War I
World War I shipwrecks in the Atlantic Ocean
Ships sunk with no fatalities